The following is a partial list of the "N" codes for Medical Subject Headings (MeSH), as defined by the United States National Library of Medicine (NLM).

This list continues the information at List of MeSH codes (N04). Codes following these are found at List of MeSH codes (V01). For other MeSH codes, see List of MeSH codes.

The source for this content is the set of 2006 MeSH Trees from the NLM.

– health care quality, access, and evaluation

– delivery of health care
  – after-hours care
  – answering services
  – attitude of health personnel
  – nurse's role
  – refusal to treat
  – attitude to death
  – attitude to health
  – health services misuse
  – unnecessary procedures
  – health knowledge, attitudes, practice
  – patient acceptance of health care
  – patient compliance
  – patient participation
  – patient satisfaction
  – treatment refusal
  – integrated delivery of health care
  – provider-sponsored organizations
  – dentist's practice patterns
  – health care costs
  – direct service costs
  – drug costs
  – employer health costs
  – hospital costs
  – health care reform
  – health expenditures
  – health priorities
  – health resources
  – health manpower
  – health services accessibility
  – health care rationing
  – health facility closure
  – health facility environment
  – health facility size
  – marketing of health services
  – social marketing
  – health services needs and demand
  – medically underserved area
  – needs assessment
  – physician's practice patterns
  – professional-patient relations
  – dentist-patient relations
  – nurse-patient relations
  – physician-patient relations
  – uncompensated care

– ethics
  – bioethics
  – clinical ethics
  – conflict of interest
  – physician self-referral
  – ethical review
  – ethics consultation
  – ethicists
  – ethics committees
  – clinical ethics committees
  – ethics committees, research
  – institutional ethics
  – professional ethics
  – codes of ethics
  – helsinki declaration
  – hippocratic oath
  – clinical ethics
  – dental ethics
  – medical ethics
  – hippocratic oath
  – nursing ethics
  – pharmacy ethics
  – research ethics

– health services research
  – health care surveys

– quality assurance, health care
  – benchmarking
  – credentialing
  – accreditation
  – Joint Commission on Accreditation of Healthcare Organizations
  – certification
  – specialty boards
  – licensure
  – dental licensure
  – hospital licensure
  – medical licensure
  – nursing licensure
  – pharmacy licensure
  – dental audit
  – facility regulation and control
  – guidelines
  – codes of ethics
  – practice guidelines
  – medical audit
  – Commission on Professional and Hospital Activities
  – nursing audit
  – professional review organizations
  – professional staff committees
  – clinical trials data monitoring committees
  – ethics committees
  – clinical ethics committees
  – research ethics committees
  – pharmacy and therapeutics committee
  – total quality management
  – utilization review
  – concurrent review
  – drug utilization review

– quality of health care
  – epidemiologic factors
  – age factors
  – age of onset
  – maternal age
  – bias (epidemiology)
  – observer variation
  – selection bias
  – causality
  – precipitating factors
  – risk factors
  – comorbidity
  – confounding factors (epidemiology)
  – effect modifiers (epidemiology)
  – cohort effect
  – healthy worker effect
  – placebo effect
  – reproductive history
  – sex factors
  – health care evaluation mechanisms
  – data collection
  – geriatric assessment
  – health surveys
  – behavioral risk factor surveillance system
  – dental health surveys
  – dental plaque index
  – dmf index
  – oral hygiene index
  – periodontal index
  – health status indicators
  – sickness impact profile
  – mass screening
  – anonymous testing
  – genetic screening
  – mass chest x-ray
  – multiphasic screening
  – neonatal screening
  – vision screening
  – nutrition surveys
  – diet surveys
  – population surveillance
  – sentinel surveillance
  – health care surveys
  – interviews
  – focus groups
  – narration
  – nutrition assessment
  – nutrition surveys
  – diet surveys
  – questionnaires
  – records
  – birth certificates
  – consent forms
  – death certificates
  – dental records
  – hospital records
  – medical records
  – medical record linkage
  – problem-oriented medical records
  – computerized medical records systems
  – trauma severity indices
  – abbreviated injury scale
  – glasgow coma scale
  – glasgow outcome scale
  – injury severity score
  – nursing records
  – registries
  – seer program
  – advance directive adherence
  – evaluation studies
  – guideline adherence
  – organizational case studies
  – outcome and process assessment (health care)
  – outcome assessment (health care)
  – treatment outcome
  – treatment failure
  – process assessment (health care)
  – patient satisfaction
  – program evaluation
  – benchmarking
  – statistics
  – actuarial analysis
  – analysis of variance
  – multivariate analysis
  – cluster analysis
  – small-area analysis
  – space-time clustering
  – confidence intervals
  – statistical data interpretation
  – discriminant analysis
  – statistical factor analysis
  – matched-pair analysis
  – statistical models
  – likelihood functions
  – linear models
  – logistic models
  – economic models
  – econometric models
  – nomograms
  – proportional hazards models
  – monte carlo method
  – probability
  – bayes theorem
  – likelihood functions
  – markov chains
  – odds ratio
  – proportional hazards models
  – risk
  – logistic models
  – risk assessment
  – risk adjustment
  – risk factors
  – uncertainty
  – regression analysis
  – least-squares analysis
  – linear models
  – logistic models
  – proportional hazards models
  – sensitivity and specificity
  – statistical distributions
  – binomial distribution
  – chi-square distribution
  – normal distribution
  – poisson distribution
  – nonparametric statistics
  – stochastic processes
  – markov chains
  – survival analysis
  – disease-free survival
  – epidemiologic study characteristics
  – epidemiologic studies
  – case-control studies
  – retrospective studies
  – cohort studies
  – follow-up studies
  – longitudinal studies
  – prospective studies
  – cross-sectional studies
  – seroepidemiologic studies
  – hiv seroprevalence
  – clinical protocols
  – antineoplastic protocols
  – clinical trials
  – phase i clinical trials
  – phase ii clinical trials
  – phase iii clinical trials
  – phase iv clinical trials
  – controlled clinical trials
  – randomized controlled trials
  – multicenter studies
  – feasibility studies
  – intervention studies
  – pilot projects
  – sampling studies
  – twin studies
  – epidemiologic research design
  – cross-over studies
  – double-blind method
  – matched-pair analysis
  – meta-analysis
  – random allocation
  – reproducibility of results
  – sample size
  – sensitivity and specificity
  – predictive value of tests
  – roc curve
  – single-blind method
  – biomedical technology assessment
  – health care peer review

The list continues at List of MeSH codes (V01).

N05